Ituzaingó is a partido of Buenos Aires Province. Its capital, the city of Ituzaingó, and the other districts in Ituzaingó Partido were part of the Morón Partido until 1995.

History

The partido of ltuzaingó stems from the Provincial Law No. 11,610 enacted on December 28, 1994, when Eduardo Duhalde was governor of the Province of Buenos Aires. It allowed the creation of the partidos of Hurlingham Partido and ltuzaingó from the division of the former partido of  Morón Partido.

During the elections of May 14, 1995 came the first elected officials of ltuzaingó Partido for 1995-1999: Alberto Daniel Descalzo was elected mayor and took office on December 11 that year at a ceremony in the hall acts of the School No. 1. At the same time, the City Council was constituted by Horacio Ramiro González (First City Council president), Marcelo Nadal, Adalberto Montes de Oca, Luis Sosa, and Jose Gonzalez composing Justicialist Party bloc. Ricardo Vallarino, Ruben Rosso, and Alberto Fusco composing  electoral coalition Frepaso-Pais bloc, and Yolanda Jaimez and Fernando Miño composing the Radical Civic Union bloc.

Settlements
Ituzaingó
Villa Udaondo

Districts
 Parque Leloir
 El Pilar
 Villa Ariza
 San Alberto

Sport
Ituzaingó Partido is home to Club Atlético Ituzaingó, a football club who play in the regionalised 4th Division.

References

External links

 

 
1995 establishments in Argentina
Partidos of Buenos Aires Province